Inmolación de Quetzalcóatl is a fountain and sculpture by Victor Manuel Contreras, installed in Plaza Tapatía, in Centro, Guadalajara, in the Mexican state of Jalisco.

References

External links

 

Centro, Guadalajara
Fountains in Mexico
Outdoor sculptures in Guadalajara